The Forstbotanischer Garten Tharandt (33.4 hectares), also known as the Sächsisches Landesarboretum (‘Saxony State Arboretum’), is an arboretum maintained by the Dresden University of Technology. It is among the oldest arboreta in the world, and is located at Am Forstgarten 1, Tharandt, Saxony, Germany, and open daily except Friday in the warmer months.

The arboretum was established in 1811 by Heinrich Cotta (1763–1844), founder of the Forestry College in Tharandt. In 1816, it was incorporated into the Royal Saxon Academy of Forestry, and in 1842 augmented by the Schweizerhaus Tharandt, a building in the Swiss style which now houses the arboretum museum. It has subsequently been expanded several times, most recently in 1998 with a new North American section (15 hectares). Today, the arboretum contains about 2,000 species and varieties of woody plants.

See also 
 List of botanical gardens in Germany

References 
 Forstbotanischer Garten Tharandt
 Tharandt description
 Dresden-und-Sachsen description
 Hermann von Helmholtz-Zentrum entry

TU Dresden
Tharandt, Forstbotanischer Garten
Tharandt, Forstbotanischer Garten
Tharandt
Forestry in Germany
History of forestry education
Culture of Saxony
Royal Saxon Academy of Forestry
1811 establishments in Saxony
1811 establishments in Germany